Amphicnaeia is a genus of beetles in the family Cerambycidae, containing the following species:

 Amphicnaeia albovittata Breuning, 1971
Amphicnaeia amicusbira Galileo, 2015
 Amphicnaeia antennata Galileo & Martins, 2001
 Amphicnaeia apicalis Melzer, 1933
 Amphicnaeia armata Galileo & Martins, 2001
Amphicnaeia bezarki Wappes, Santos-Silva & Galileo, 2019
Amphicnaeia birai Galileo, 2015
 Amphicnaeia bivittata Melzer, 1933
 Amphicnaeia brevivittis Bates, 1872
 Amphicnaeia crustulata Bates, 1872
Amphicnaeia distincta Bezark, Santos-Silva & Devesa, 2020
 Amphicnaeia flavescens Martins & Galileo, 1999
 Amphicnaeia flavofemorata Breuning, 1940
 Amphicnaeia flavolineata Breuning, 1943
 Amphicnaeia flavovittata Breuning, 1940
Amphicnaeia distincta Wappes, Santos-Silva & Galileo, 2019
Amphicnaeia gouverneuri Vitali, 2021
 Amphicnaeia interrupta Galileo & Martins, 2003
 Amphicnaeia lepida Melzer, 1933
 Amphicnaeia lineata Bates, 1866
 Amphicnaeia lineolata Galileo & Martins, 2011
 Amphicnaeia lyctoides Bates, 1866
Amphicnaeia martinsi Galileo, 2015
 Amphicnaeia nigra Galileo & Martins, 2001
Amphicnaeia odettae Bezark, Santos-Silva & Devesa, 2020
Amphicnaeia panamensis Wappes, Santos-Silva & Galileo, 2019
 Amphicnaeia piriana Martins & Galileo, 2001
 Amphicnaeia pretiosa Galileo & Martins, 2001
 Amphicnaeia pusilla Bates, 1866
 Amphicnaeia quadrifasciata Nascimento & Santos-Silva, 2018
Amphicnaeia quinquevittata Bates, 1885
 Amphicnaeia rileyi Wappes, Santos-Silva & Galileo, 2019
Amphicnaeia sexnotata Melzer, 1933
 Amphicnaeia strandi Breuning, 1942
 Amphicnaeia tate Galileo & Martins, 2001
 Amphicnaeia trivitticollis Breuning, 1961
Amphicnaeia ubirajarai Galileo, 2015
 Amphicnaeia villosula (Thomson, 1868)
 Amphicnaeia vitticollis Breuning, 1940
 Amphicnaeia zonata Martins & Galileo, 2001

References

 
Apomecynini
Cerambycidae genera